The 1992 German Open was a men's tennis tournament played on outdoor clay courts. It was the 86th edition of the Hamburg Masters (Hamburg Masters), and was part of the ATP Super 9 of the 1992 ATP Tour. It took place at the Rothenbaum Tennis Center in Hamburg, Germany, from 4 May until 11 May 1992. First-seeded Stefan Edberg won the singles title.

Finals

Singles

 Stefan Edberg defeated  Michael Stich 5–7, 6–4, 6–1,
It was Stefan Edberg's 1st title of the year, and his 35th overall. It was his 1st Masters title of the year, and his 4th overall.

Doubles

 Sergio Casal /  Emilio Sánchez defeated  Carl-Uwe Steeb /  Michael Stich 5–7, 6–4, 6–3

References

External links
  
   
 Association of Tennis Professionals (ATP) tournament profile

 
German Open
Hamburg European Open
ATP German Open